Mihály Esztergomi (13 June 1912 – 25 November 1993) was a Hungarian long-distance runner. He competed in the marathon at the 1952 Summer Olympics.

References

External links
 

1912 births
1993 deaths
Athletes (track and field) at the 1952 Summer Olympics
Hungarian male long-distance runners
Hungarian male marathon runners
Olympic athletes of Hungary
Sportspeople from Komárom-Esztergom County
20th-century Hungarian people